Eugene Allison Smith ((October 17, 1922 – March 23, 1980) was an American politician and farmer.

Smith was born in Montevideo, Minnesota and graduated from Montevideo High School in 1940. He went to University of Minnesota and St. Olaf College. Smith served in the United States Army Air Force during World War II. He was a farmer and lived in Montevideo, Minnesota with his wife and family. Smith served in the Minnesota House of Representatives in 1971 and 1972 and was on the Montevideo Library Board. Smith died at a hospital in Peoria, Illinois after suffering a heart attack; he was performing with the Gay Nineties Quartet in Peoria, Illinois.

References

1922 births
1980 deaths
People from Montevideo, Minnesota
Military personnel from Minnesota
Farmers from Minnesota
St. Olaf College alumni
University of Minnesota alumni
Members of the Minnesota House of Representatives